Kamouraska is a regional county municipality in eastern Quebec, Canada. The regional county municipality seat is Saint-Pascal, but the largest town is La Pocatière.

The area is an important research, development and education centre for agriculture. Factories in the region produce metal products and public transportation equipment. One of the people instrumental in settling and developing this area was Pascal Taché, an early seigneur.

The name "Kamouraska" comes from an Algonquin word meaning "where rushes grow at the water's edge".

Geography

Adjacent counties and municipalities
 Aroostook County, Maine – southeast
 L'Islet Regional County Municipality, Quebec – southwest

Subdivisions
There are 19 subdivisions within the RCM:

Cities & Towns (2)
La Pocatière
Saint-Pascal

Municipalities (12)
 Kamouraska
 Mont-Carmel
 Rivière-Ouelle
 Saint-Alexandre-de-Kamouraska
 Saint-André-de-Kamouraska
 Saint-Bruno-de-Kamouraska
 Saint-Denis-De La Bouteillerie
 Sainte-Hélène-de-Kamouraska
 Saint-Gabriel-Lalemant
 Saint-Germain-de-Kamouraska
 Saint-Onésime-d'Ixworth
 Saint-Pacôme

Parishes (3)
Sainte-Anne-de-la-Pocatière
Saint-Joseph-de-Kamouraska
Saint-Philippe-de-Néri

Unorganized Territory (2)
 Petit-Lac-Sainte-Anne
 Picard

Transportation

Access routes
Highways and numbered routes that run through the municipality, including external routes that start or finish at the county border:

Autoroutes

Principal Highways

Secondary Highways

External Routes
None

See also
 List of regional county municipalities and equivalent territories in Quebec

References

External links
Kamouraska Regional County Municipality Official site

Regional county municipalities in Bas-Saint-Laurent
Census divisions of Quebec